Ronald Edsforth is a Visiting Professor of History, and Chair of Globalization Studies in the MALS Department at Dartmouth College.

Edsforth has published several books, including The New Deal: America's Response to the Great Depression. He has also acted a consultant for the PBS documentary, America on Wheels.

Edsforth has taught courses in Globalization Studies and in War and Peace Studies in recent years.  He is currently writing a history of the world peace movement.  He has been a vocal opponent of the Iraq War.

Bibliography
The New Deal: America's Response to the Great Depression
Class Conflict and Cultural Consensus: The Making of a Mass Consumer Society in Flint, Michigan
Popular Culture and Political Change in Modern America
Autowork.

Dartmouth College faculty
Living people
Year of birth missing (living people)